East Kootenay North was an electoral district in the Canadian province of British Columbia in the 1898 and 1900 elections only.  Its official name was East Kootenay (North Riding).  It was created by a partition of the old East Kootenay riding which also created its sibling, East Kootenay (south riding). Successor ridings in the East Kootenay region were Fernie, Cranbrook and Columbia.

Election results
Election winners are in bold.

|-

|- bgcolor="white"
!align="right" colspan=3|Total valid votes
!align="right"|317
!align="right"|100.00%
!align="right"|
|- bgcolor="white"
!align="right" colspan=3|Total rejected ballots
!align="right"|
!align="right"|
!align="right"|
|- bgcolor="white"
!align="right" colspan=3|Turnout
!align="right"|55.37%
!align="right"|
!align="right"|
|}

See also
Kootenay (electoral districts)

References
Electoral History of BC 1871-1986, Elections BC

Former provincial electoral districts of British Columbia
East Kootenay